Return of a Stranger may refer to:

 Return of a Stranger (1937 film), a 1937 British drama film
 Return of a Stranger (1961 film), a 1961 British thriller film